Breda O'Brien (born 1962) is an Irish teacher and columnist, writing a weekly column for The Irish Times. O'Brien is a frequent spokesperson for Catholic-based views on political issues such as opposition to abortion and same-sex marriage. She founded the Irish chapter of Feminists for Life in 1992.

Early life and education
Born in Dungarvan, County Waterford, O'Brien was educated at the Convent of Mercy, Dungarvan and later at the Mater Dei Institute of Education, Dublin, qualifying as a teacher.

Career
O'Brien taught English and Religion, at Muckross Park College, a public Catholic girls' school, between 1983 and 1987. She later returned to this post in 1992, and has remained there since. She has worked as a video producer and communications trainer in the Catholic Communications Centre (founded by the Irish Catholic Bishops' Conference), Booterstown, Dublin from 1988 to 1991. She worked as a researcher for RTÉ from 1991 to 1992. Her career as a columnist began with The Sunday Business Post from 1997 to 2000 and continued with The Irish Times.

O'Brien is a patron of the Iona Institute, a conservative Catholic pressure group, and appears regularly in the Irish media as a contributor, supporting the teachings of the Catholic Church.

In her Irish Times column, she has expressed her opposition to abortion in all circumstances, including rape, incest and fatal foetal abnormality, and to same-sex marriage.

Her stance on civil partnerships has changed. Initially opposed to them in 2008, and 2010 by 2015, in the run up to the Irish marriage equality referendum, she claimed to be in support of them.

O'Brien, along with other members of the Iona Institute took legal action against RTE and Panti Bliss for being labelled as homophobes for campaigning against marriage equality. This was the impetus for Panti's Noble Call speech.

She is married, and has four children who have been home-schooled.

See also
 Patricia Casey
 David Quinn
 John Waters
 Iona Institute
 Abortion in the Republic of Ireland
 LGBT rights in the Republic of Ireland

References

1962 births
20th-century Irish people
21st-century Irish people
Alumni of Mater Dei Institute of Education
Irish anti-same-sex-marriage activists
Business Post people
Conservatism in Ireland
Irish Roman Catholics
Irish anti-abortion activists
Irish schoolteachers
Irish social commentators
Irish women activists
Irish women journalists
Living people
People from Dungarvan
The Irish Times people